Marquam Hill is a populated hill located just south of Downtown Portland, Oregon, United States in the Homestead neighborhood. It is also called Pill Hill because it is home to Oregon Health & Science University, Portland VA Medical Center and Shriners Children's Portland.

Marquam Hill was named for Philip A. Marquam. It is classed by the United States Geological Survey as a populated place and not as a hill. It is part of the Tualatin Mountains, along with nearby Council Crest and Portland Heights.

References

Oregon Health & Science University
Geography of Portland, Oregon
Landforms of Multnomah County, Oregon
Hills of Oregon
Southwest Portland, Oregon